The Massachusetts Air and Space Museum, is located in Hyannis, Massachusetts. Its exhibits portray the role that Massachusetts people and organizations have played in the advancement of the aviation and space industry. Its collection includes aerospace systems, photographs, and artifacts.

In 2007, a group of people from the space and aviation industries founded a non-profit tax-exempt organization to establish an air and space museum. 

It has been funded through grants and private and corporate donations. The museum's activities are overseen by a board of directors.

References

External links

Aerospace museums in Massachusetts